Jan Rune Grave (born May 8, 1977) is a Norwegian nordic combined skier who competed from 1998 to 2006. At the 2002 Winter Olympics in Salt Lake City, he finished fifth in the 4 x 5 km team event and 24th in the 15 km individual event.

Grave's best World Cup finish was seventh in a 15 km individual event in Germany in 2002. His only victory was in a World Cup B 7.5 km sprint event in Finland in 2001.

External links

1977 births
Nordic combined skiers at the 2002 Winter Olympics
Living people
Norwegian male Nordic combined skiers
Olympic Nordic combined skiers of Norway